Jutta Lampe (13 December 19373 December 2020) was a German actress on stage and in film. She was for 30 years a leading actress at the Schaubühne founded in Berlin by her husband Peter Stein, where she played both classical theatre such as Alkmene in Kleist's Amphitryon, and world premieres including Robert Wilson's Orlando for one actor, and roles that Botho Strauß created for her. She was also engaged at the Vienna Burgtheater and the Schauspielhaus Zürich. She appeared in more than twenty films from 1963, including lead roles in films by Margarethe von Trotta. Lampe was named Actress of the Year by Theater heute several times. Other awards included the Gertrud-Eysoldt-Ring and the Joana Maria Gorvin Prize for her life's work.

Life and career 

Born in Flensburg, Lampe appeared on stage first at age eight in ballet. She had her first engagement at the Staatstheater Wiesbaden, followed by the Nationaltheater Mannheim. In the 1960s, she was successful at Theater Bremen where she worked with directors including Peter Zadek and Peter Stein. She played Lady Milford in Schiller's Kabale und Liebe directed by Stein, alongside Bruno Ganz and Edith Clever. She appeared in Shakespeare's Measure for Measure directed by Zadek, and the Princess in Goethe's Torquato Tasso directed by Stein.

When Stein founded the Schaubühne in Berlin in 1970, she was one of the first leading women in the ensemble, but always regarding herself as part of the team. She worked there for 30 years. She played Athene in Stein's production of the Orestie by Aischylos. In Klaus Michael Grüber's staging of Shakespeare's Hamlet in 1982, she played Ophelia "as if in a trance". In his production of Kleist's  in 1991, she was Alkmene. She performed in several plays by Botho Strauß, directed by Luc Bondy. Strauss had seen her in Wiesbaden at the beginning of her career. With director Robert Wilson, she worked for the premiere of his play Orlando, which he based on the novel by Virginia Woolf. As the play's only actor, she played many roles, changing gender and period on a time voyage.

From 2001 to 2002, Lampe was a member of the Burgtheater in Vienna. She played there Arkadina in Chekhov's Die Möwe, directed by Bondy, alongside Gert Voss in a production also shown at the Berliner Theatertreffen. Directed by Edith Clever, she played Winnie in Beckett's Glückliche Tage, with irony and sarcasm. She performed in Berlin once more in 2005, with Clever in a play for two women, Die eine und die andere, which Botho Strauß dedicated to them, staged by Bondy. From 2005 to 2008 she was engaged at the Schauspielhaus Zürich. One of her last roles on stage was there in 2009, in Shaw's Major Barbara which was also Zadek's last premiere.

She was married to Peter Stein from 1967 to 1984. Jutta Lampe died in Berlin on 3 December 2020, ten days before her 83rd birthday, after a long struggle with dementia.

Theatre 

Source:

 Theater Bremen
 Lady Milford in Schiller's Kabale und Liebe, 1967
 Leonore in Goethe's Torquato Tasso, 1968
 Elisabeth in Schiller's Don Carlos, 1969
 Schaubühne Berlin
 Solveig in Ibsen's Peer Gynt, 1971
 Marianne in Horváth's Geschichten aus dem Wienerwald, 1972
 Physician in Gorki's Die Sommergäste, 1974
 Charlotte Sonntag in Else Lasker-Schüler's Die Wupper, 1976
 Athene in Orestie by Aischylos, 1982
 K. in Kalldewey by Botho Strauß, 1983
 Mascha in Chekhov's Drei Schwestern, 1984
 Ranevskaja in Chekhov's Der Kirschgarten, 1989
 Title role in Robert Wilson's Orlando after Virginia Woolf's novel, premiere, 1989
 Alkmene in Kleist's , 1991
 Madame de Montreuil in Mishima's Madame de Sade, 1996
 Rosie Büdesheimer in Rudolf Borchardt's Der Hausbesuch, 1997
 Title role in Racine's Andromache, 2004
 Lissie in Die eine und die andere by Botho Strauß, 2005
 Salzburg Festival
 Lilly Groth in Das Gleichgewicht by Botho Strauß, 1993
 Ilse in Luigi Pirandello's , 1994
 Vienna
 Agathe / Ellen Seegast in Die Ähnlichen by Botho Strauß, Theater in der Josefstadt, 1998
 Arkadina in Chekhov's Die Möwe, Wiener Festwochen in co-production with the Burgtheater, 2000
 Winnie in Beckett's Glückliche Tage, Burgtheater in co-production with the Berliner Ensemble, 2002
 Schauspielhaus Zürich
 Ella in Ibsen's John Gabriel Borkman, 2005
 Amanda in Die Glasmenagerie by Tennessee Williams, 2007
Mrs. Baines in Shaw's Major Barbara, 2009

Films 

Awards 
Lampe's awards included:
 1982: 
 1988: , by Theater heute
 1990: Actress of the Year
 1992: Theaterpreis Berlin, by Stiftung Preußische Seehandlung
 1998: Order Pour le Mérite für Wissenschaften und Künste
 1999: Knight Commander's Cross of the Order of Merit of the Federal Republic of Germany
 1998: Gertrud-Eysoldt-Ring
 2000: Actress of the Year
 2004: Stanislawski-Prize of the Moscow Theater Institute
 2010: Joana Maria Gorvin Prize

References

Further reading 

 : Jutta Lampe : magische Krisen (= Resonanzen; 3). Lit, Berlin/Münster, 2010, .
  (ed.): Jutta Lampe – träumen, suchen, spielen. Akademie der Künste, Berlin, 2010, .

External links 

 
 

1937 births
2020 deaths
German film actresses
German stage actresses
20th-century German actresses
People from Flensburg
Recipients of the Pour le Mérite (civil class)
Knights Commander of the Order of Merit of the Federal Republic of Germany